Così parlò Bellavista is a 1984 Italian comedy film based on the novel of the same name by Luciano De Crescenzo. De Crescenzo directed the film and also played the main role. For this film De Crescenzo won David di Donatello and Nastro d'Argento for  best new director, while Marina Confalone won the same awards in the best supporting actress category.

Plot summary 
In Naples, Professor Bellavista is a retired man, passionate about the philosophy and thought of Ancient Greece. Every day, in his luxurious apartment, he teaches his lessons of life to the poor-nothing (his friends), who are dazzled by his reasoning. One day, however, the quiet life of the building of Bellavista will be disturbed by the arrival of a director of Milan. Between Naples and Milan there is a sharp contrast, because the Neapolitans are accustomed to enjoy a quiet life, always based on the "philosophy of pleasure and delay", while the northern Italians are very strict and punctual.

Cast 
 Luciano De Crescenzo - Professor Bellavista
 Isa Danieli - Mrs Bellavista
 Lorella Morlotti - Patrizia
 Geppy Gleijeses - Giorgio
 Marina Confalone -  La cameriera 
 Renato Scarpa - Cazzaniga
 Antonio Allocca -  "Core N'grato"
 Nunzio Gallo -  Camorrista
 Riccardo Pazzaglia -  L'uomo del cavalluccio rosso

References

External links 

1984 comedy films
Italian comedy films
Films directed by Luciano De Crescenzo
1984 directorial debut films
1984 films
Films set in Naples
Cultural depictions of philosophers
1980s Italian-language films
1980s Italian films